Major League: Back to the Minors is a 1998 American  sports comedy film written and directed by John Warren. It is the third installment in the Major League film series (following 1989's Major League and 1994's Major League II) and is considered a standalone sequel.

Plot 
Aging minor league pitcher Gus Cantrell, who plays for the Fort Myers Miracle, is ejected from the game following the "frozen ball trick". Roger Dorn, now the owner of the Minnesota Twins, recruits Gus to be the manager of the Buzz, the Twins' AAA minor league affiliate. Gus's mission is to make a real team out of a bunch of players who include ballet dancer turned ballplayer Lance "The Dance" Pere, minor league lifer Frank "Pops" Morgan, Rube Baker, Taka Tanaka, Pedro Cerrano, pitcher Hog Ellis, home run hitter Billy "Downtown" Anderson, and pitcher Carlton "Doc" Windgate, a medical school graduate who throws the slowest fastball in the minors.

However, Gus clashes with Leonard Huff, the snobby manager of the Twins. One night in Minnesota, Gus and his fiancee Maggie Reynolds are having dinner with Roger and Huff at an upscale restaurant, where Huff challenges Gus to a game between the Buzz and the Twins. Gus accepts the challenge.

The game is scheduled to take place at the Hubert H. Humphrey Metrodome in Minnesota. The Twins take a 3-0 lead in the 6th inning, but Downtown hits a home run that ties the game at 3-3 in the 8th inning. But with two outs in the bottom of the 9th inning, and with Doc one strike away from striking out home run hitter Carlos Liston, Huff has the stadium's lights turned off so the game can end with a tie rather than give the Buzz a chance to win in extra innings. However, the media reports that the Twins were still outplayed by the Buzz.

Huff now wants to bring Downtown up to the Twins, even though Gus believes that he is not yet ready. Anderson jumps on the opportunity, turning his back on Gus. Without Downtown, the Buzz start losing again. With the Twins, Anderson starts hitting poorly, proving Huff wrong. Gus manages to get the Buzz back on track, and Downtown is sent back down to the Buzz, where Gus teaches him how to be a more well rounded hitter. Gus leads the Buzz to a division title in their league.

Gus issues a challenge for Huff to bring the Twins to Buzz Stadium for another game. If the Twins win, Gus will give his salary for the year to Huff. If Gus and the Buzz beat the Twins, Gus can take over as the manager of the Twins. Huff accepts the challenge and takes the Twins to play against the Buzz. This time, the Twins take a 4-0 lead in the 6th inning, but the Buzz still manage to come from behind with three runs, and then win the game, 5-4, thanks to a game-winning two-run home run by Downtown. Gus decides that he wants to stay with the Buzz so he can continue to work with minor league players on their skills and hopefully turn them into stars.

Cast

Reception

Box office
The film flopped at the box office, grossing only $3.6 million in ticket sales against a budget of $18 million.

Critical response
 Audiences polled by CinemaScore gave the film an average grade of "B-" on an A+ to F scale.

Possible sequel
David S. Ward, the writer and producer of the original Major League, announced in 2010 that he was working on a new film, which he calls Major League 3, which instead acts as a proper sequel to the second film and hoped to cast the original stars Charlie Sheen, Wesley Snipes and Tom Berenger. The plot would have seen Sheen's character Ricky "Wild Thing" Vaughn coming out of retirement to work with a young player.

References

External links 
 
 
 

1998 films
1990s sports comedy films
American sequel films
American sports comedy films
Minnesota Twins
American baseball films
Films shot in Minnesota
Films set in Minnesota
Films shot in South Carolina
Warner Bros. films
Morgan Creek Productions films
Films scored by Robert Folk
1998 comedy films
1990s American films
Films about Major League Baseball